AUJ or Auj may refer to:

 Auj, a village in Iran
 Austrojet (ICAO code: AUJ), an Austrian charter airline
 Awjila language (ISO 639-3 code: auj), a Berber language of Libya
 The Hobbit: An Unexpected Journey, a 2012 fantasy film